The 1994 Colorado State Rams football team represented Colorado State University in the 1994 NCAA Division I-A football season. This was the 98th year of football at CSU and the second under Sonny Lubick. The Rams played their home games at Hughes Stadium in Fort Collins, Colorado. They finished the season 10–2, and 7–1 in the Western Athletic Conference.  As champions of the WAC, they were invited to the 1994 Holiday Bowl, where they lost to the Michigan Wolverines.

Schedule

Roster

Rankings

Game summaries

at Arizona

at Fresno State

vs. Michigan (Holiday Bowl)

Team players in the NFL
No Colorado State players were selected in the 1995 NFL Draft.

References

Colorado State
Colorado State Rams football seasons
Colorado State Rams football